"Entrance of the Gladiators" op. 68 or "Entry of the Gladiators" is a military march composed in 1897 by the Czech composer Julius Fučík. He originally titled it "Grande Marche Chromatique", reflecting the use of chromatic scales throughout the piece, but changed the title based on his personal interest in the Roman Empire.

Generally, the march is divided into three parts. The first part contains the melody that the trumpet keeps and the several supporting parts. The second part is the section where the low brass (mainly the tubas) take over with the chromatic scale-like role. Finally there is a trio, or a softer melodic section, where there is a strong balance between woodwinds and low brass. The trio has a part similar to the second part with a chromatic scale-like sound. The piece is written in cut time and is originally written to be played at standard march tempo, but when played as a screamer it is usually played much faster.

History

Czech composer Julius Fučík wrote the march on October 17, 1897, in Sarajevo, where he had been stationed as military bandmaster of the Austro-Hungarian Army since 1897. Originally, he called the piece Grande Marche Chromatique. The march demonstrates the state of the art in playing technology and the construction of brass instruments, which allowed fast and even chromatic gears in all instruments and positions. Fučík was so impressed by the description of a gladiator appearance in a Roman amphitheater in Henryk Sienkiewicz's 1895 novel Quo Vadis that he soon changed the title of his work. The phrase "entry of the gladiators" is known in two descriptions of Pompeii in 1877 and is probably older.

On January 10, 1900,  Anton Fridrich (1849–1924) created an arrangement for string orchestra for himself in Graz. In July 1900, the "Concert March for large orchestra", published by Hoffmann's widow in Prague, is listed under the title  by Hofmeister. Further edits followed. In 1903 one of the Coldstream Guard Band's pre-recorded clay roller advertised by Columbia Records titled Entry of the Gladiators. In the same year, a piano score with the title "Entry of the Gladiators / Thunder and Blazes" was released. The phrase 'Entrance of the Gladiators', which has existed since at least the 18th century, is also common in English.

Hermann Ludwig Blankenburg published his farewell to the gladiators at the latest in 1904. In 1928, both pieces were recorded by the "Great Odeon Orchestra" on a plate (No. 85204).

Adaptations and uses

In 1901, American publisher Carl Fischer published a version of this march, arranged for American wind bands by Canadian composer Louis-Philippe Laurendeau, under the title "Thunder and Blazes". It was during this period that the piece gained lasting popularity as a screamer march for circuses, often used to introduce clowns. Today it is known mainly by this association. Laurendeau's version was also transcribed for fairground organs.

In 1915 the New York Military Band recorded the march (Edison Records, 50214).

The first portion of the piece has been quoted in such songs as "Goodbye, Cruel World" (1961) by James Darren; "Palisades Park" (1962) by Freddy Cannon; "Yakety Sax" (1963) by Boots Randolph; "Tight Rope" (1972) by Leon Russell; "The Show Must Go On" (1973) by Leo Sayer, covered by Three Dog Night (1974); "Mr. Soft" by Cockney Rebel (1974); "Sideshow" (1974) by Blue Magic; "Esther" (1989) by Phish; "Don't Get It Twisted" (2006) by Gwen Stefani; and "Freak" (2022) by Demi Lovato. It is used in Nino Rota's score for Federico Fellini's film La Dolce Vita (1960). In the film version of Godspell (1973), Judas hums it when he begins his betrayal and crucifixion of Jesus. (In that adaptation, Jesus and all the disciples are dressed and made up as clowns.)

The march receives the occasional concert hall performance, such as at the 2007 Last Night of the Proms.

See also
 Circus music

References

External links
 
 

Compositions by Julius Fučík
1897 compositions
Military marches
Circus music
Theme music